Pillar College (formerly Somerset Christian College) is a private evangelical Christian college with the main campus in Newark, New Jersey and educational locations in Somerset, Paterson, Plainfield, and Jersey City. Pillar College is accredited by the Middle States Commission on Higher Education.

History
Pillar College was established in 2001 as Somerset Christian College in the buildings and property formerly used by Zarephath Bible Institute, founded in 1908, and Alma White College, founded in 1921.  Like SCC, these institutions were established by The Pillar of Fire Church, now Pillar of Fire International, as training schools for missionaries, preachers, and teachers.  While both ZBI and AWC were either completely or mostly dormant for approximately three decades, in 2001, under the sponsorship of Pillar of Fire International, the same parent organization of ZBI and AWC, the New Jersey Commission on Higher Education issued the newly created Somerset Christian College a charter to grant the two-year associate degree in Biblical Studies. In 2006 the college was approved to offer four-year Bachelor of Arts degrees.  Somerset Christian College became Pillar College in April 2013.

Academics
Pillar College offers traditional Associate's, Bachelor's, and Master's Degrees.
Pillar College is accredited through the following organizations:  
 Middle States Commission on Higher Education
 Association for Biblical Higher Education

See also
Post-secondary education in New Jersey

References

External links
 Official website

2001 establishments in New Jersey
Christian universities and colleges in the United States
Educational institutions established in 2001
Private universities and colleges in New Jersey
Universities and colleges in Newark, New Jersey
Bible colleges
Zarephath, New Jersey
Universities and colleges in Somerset County, New Jersey
Evangelicalism in New Jersey